The Farnworth by-election was held on 27 November 1952.  The election was held due to the death of the incumbent Labour MP, George Tomlinson.  It was won by the Labour candidate Ernest Thornton.

References

Farnworth
Farnworth
1950s in Lancashire
Farnworth 1952
Farnworth 1952
Farnworth 1952
Farnworth